Baptist or baptists or variation, may refer to:

Religion
 A person who baptizes people, who performs a baptism
 John the Baptist, Jewish religious figure and element of Christian religion
 The Baptists, a Protestant Christian denomination
 Baptist beliefs
 List of Baptists
 List of Baptist churches
 List of Baptist denominations

People 
 Baptist (surname)
 Baptist Fernando (1933-2017), Sri Lankan Sinhala actor and producer

Places
 Baptist, Kentucky, USA; a town

Other uses
 Baptists (band), Canadian hardcore punk band

See also

 
 
 Baptism (disambiguation)
 St. John the Baptist (disambiguation)
 Saint John (disambiguation)
 Batista (Spanish/Portuguese surname) 
 Battista (Italian surname and given name) Italian term meaning "Baptist"
 Bautista (Spanish surname) Spanish term meaning "Baptist"
 Baptista (Portuguese surname) Portuguese term meaning "Baptist"
 Baptiste (name) (French surname and given name) French term meaning "Baptist"
 Baptiste (disambiguation)
 Baptista (disambiguation)